Ghazi Tehsil is a tehsil located in Haripur District, Khyber Pakhtunkhwa, Pakistan.  The tehsil, headquartered at the town of Ghazi, is itself subdivided into 8 Union Councils, Assistant Commissioner of Ghazi is Muhammad Shojain Vistro. The main languages spoken in the area are Hindko and Pashto.

References

Haripur District
Tehsils of Khyber Pakhtunkhwa